Newry railway station serves Newry and Bessbrook in Northern Ireland. The station is located in the northwest of Newry, County Armagh on the Dublin-Belfast line close to the Craigmore Viaduct.

History

The port of Newry was already a transport hub by 1742 with the opening of the Newry Canal to Lough Neagh. By the start of the twentieth century Newry had become a railway hub, with the Belfast to Dublin line passing to the west of the town, while lines from the ports of Warrenpoint and Greenore either side of Carlingford Lough converged closer to the centre of town where stations were more conveniently situated.

The current Newry station originally opened in 1855 as Newry Main Line, renamed Bessbrook & Newry Main Line in 1866, renamed again as Bessbrook in 1880 before closing in 1942.

With this closure Newry was served by the Edward Street station, however this was to close with the Warrenpoint branch in 1965, leaving Newry with no railway station.

The station re-opened in 1984 as an NIR Intercity station, with basic facilities such as a temporary booking office. These facilities remained in place for over 20 years from the station's opening by which time their condition was deteriorating. In order to improve facilities for passengers a modern new station building was constructed and officially opened on 26 November 2009.

Other stations in Newry
 Albert Basin, on the canal branch.
 Armagh Road, temporary station at Mullaghlass on main line.
 Bridge Street, Dundalk, Newry and Greenore Railway station.
 Dublin Bridge, Newry, Warrenpoint and Rostrevor Railway (NW&RR).
 Edward Street, Opened by the Newry and Armagh Railway (then Newry and Enniskillen) in 1854.
 Kilmorey Street, Original terminus of NW&RR.

Service 
These trains call at Newry for both destinations at two-hour intervals throughout the day. The station experiences favourable passenger numbers from this service. There are also four trains to and from Bangor, operated by Northern Ireland Railways.

On Sundays, there are five Enterprise trains in each direction, and no NIR services.

Additionally, two peak time services are operated each day to and from Newry by Iarnród Éireann, with the first one being the 06:30 service to Dublin Connolly, calling at Commuter stations between Newry and Dublin Connolly except Gormanston, Portmarnock, Clongriffin, and Howth Junction. The first peak service to Newry started in January 2018, with the 17:13 service from Dublin Pearse being extended to Newry from Dundalk.

Route

Gallery

References

Footnotes

Sources

External links 

Northern Ireland Railways page on the Cross Border line
Northern Ireland Railways page on the Enterprise Service

Railway stations in County Armagh
Newry
Railway stations opened in 1855
Railway stations closed in 1942
Railway stations opened in 1984
Reopened railway stations in Northern Ireland
Railway stations opened by NI Railways
Railway stations served by NI Railways
Railway stations served by Enterprise
1855 establishments in Ireland
Railway stations in Northern Ireland opened in the 20th century
Railway stations in Northern Ireland opened in the 19th century